Willie Ito (born July 17, 1934) is an American animator. He worked for Walt Disney Animation Studios in the 1950s, moved to Warner Bros. Cartoons and Hanna-Barbera Productions as a character designer, and later returned to Disney.

Biography
Ito was born in San Francisco, California to Japanese immigrant parents. Seeing Snow White and the Seven Dwarfs in a cinema as a child inspired his love for animation.

Ito's family was incarcerated during World War II due to Executive Order 9066, first at the Tanforan Assembly Center, and later the Topaz War Relocation Center in Utah. Following his family's release from Topaz, Ito and his family returned to San Francisco.  After completing high school, Ito began to pursue an art career, attending the Chouinard Art Institute in Los Angeles.

In 1954, Ito began working for Walt Disney Studios as an assistant to animator Iwao Takamoto on the film Lady and the Tramp. He later joined Warner Bros. Cartoons, where he worked with the animators Chuck Jones and Friz Freleng. According to Ito, Freleng borrowed him from the Chuck Jones unit, resuting in his first screen credit as a layout artist for Prince Violent.

In the 1960s, Ito moved to Hanna-Barbera Productions and continued working there for 14 years, contributing to shows including The Jetsons, The Flintstones, The Yogi Bear Show, and Josie and the Pussycats. Ito returned to Disney in 1977, where he worked in its consumer products division. His work consisted of designing Disney merchandise. Ito returned to the animation studio in 1985 for three months, working for The Wuzzles and Adventures of the Gummi Bears. He retired from animation on July 31, 1999.

In addition to animation, Ito has illustrated several children's books.

Ito received an Inkpot Award in 2014. In 2021, he received the Winsor McCay Award from the International Animated Film Society at the 48th annual Annie Awards, in recognition for his career accomplishments in the animation industry.

References

External links

1934 births
American people of Japanese descent
Japanese-American internees
Artists from San Francisco
Chouinard Art Institute alumni
Hanna-Barbera people
Walt Disney Animation Studios people
Animators from California
American children's book illustrators
Living people
Warner Bros. Cartoons people